Chap Sandi is a village of Bhakkar District in the Punjab Province of Pakistan.

Populated places in Bhakkar District